Canarium sarawakanum is a tree of Borneo in the incense tree family Burseraceae. The specific epithet  is from the Latin,  referring to the species being native to Sarawak.

Description
Its twigs are reddish brown.

Distribution and habitat
Canarium sarawakanum is endemic to Borneo where it is confined to Sarawak. Its habitat is lowland to submontane forests from sea-level to  altitude.

References

sarawakanum
Endemic flora of Borneo
Flora of Sarawak
Trees of Borneo
Vulnerable flora of Asia
Plants described in 1994
Taxonomy articles created by Polbot